Iris Shun-Ru Chang (March 28, 1968November 9, 2004) was a Chinese American journalist, author of historical books and political activist. She is best known for her best-selling 1997 account of the Nanking Massacre, The Rape of Nanking, and in 2003, The Chinese in America: A Narrative History.  Chang is the subject of the 2007 biography Finding Iris Chang, and the 2007 documentary film Iris Chang: The Rape of Nanking starring Olivia Cheng as Iris Chang. The independent 2007 documentary film Nanking was based on her work and dedicated to her memory.

Life and education 
Iris Chang was the daughter of two university professors, Ying-Ying Chang and Dr. Shau-Jin Chang, who moved from mainland China to Taiwan and eventually emigrated to the United States. Chang was born in Princeton, New Jersey and raised in Champaign-Urbana, Illinois.

Chang grew up hearing stories about the Nanking massacre, from which her maternal grandparents managed to escape. When she tried finding books about the subject in Champaign Public Library, she found there were none.

She attended University Laboratory High School of Urbana, Illinois, and graduated in 1985. She was initially a computer science major, but switched to journalism, earning a bachelor's degree at the University of Illinois at Urbana-Champaign in 1989. During her time in college she also worked as a New York Times stringer from Urbana-Champaign, and wrote six front-page articles over the course of one year.

After brief stints at the Associated Press and the Chicago Tribune, she pursued a master's degree in Writing Seminars at Johns Hopkins University. She then embarked on her career as an author and lectured and wrote magazine articles.

In 1991, Chang married Bretton Lee Douglas, a design engineer for Cisco Systems, whom she had met in college, and had one son, Christopher, who was two years old at the time of her suicide. She lived in San Jose, California in the final years of her life.

Career 
Chang wrote three books documenting the experiences of Chinese and Chinese Americans in history. Her first, Thread of the Silkworm (Basic Books, 1995) tells the life story of the Chinese professor, Hsue-Shen Tsien (or Qian Xuesen) during the Red Scare in the 1950s. Although Tsien was one of the founders of NASA's Jet Propulsion Laboratory (JPL), and for many years helped the military of the United States debrief scientists from Nazi Germany, he was suddenly accused of being a spy and a member of the Communist Party USA, and was placed under house arrest from 1950 to 1955. Tsien left for the People's Republic of China in September 1955. Upon his return to China, Tsien developed the Dongfeng missile program, and later the Silkworm missile, which was used by the Iraqi military during its war on Iran and against the United States-led coalitions during the Persian Gulf War and the 2003 invasion of Iraq.

 
Her second book, The Rape of Nanking: The Forgotten Holocaust of World War II (1997), was published on the 60th anniversary of the Nanking Massacre and was motivated in part by her own grandparents' stories about their escape from the massacre. It documents atrocities committed against Chinese by forces of the Imperial Japanese Army during the Second Sino-Japanese War, and includes interviews with victims. The Rape of Nanking remained on the New York Times Bestseller list for 10 weeks. Based on the book, an American documentary film, Nanking, was released in 2007.

After publication of the book, Chang campaigned to persuade the Japanese government to apologize for its troops' wartime conduct and to pay compensation.

Her third book, The Chinese in America: A Narrative History (2003), is a history of Chinese Americans, that argues their treatment as perpetual outsiders by American society. Consistent with the style of her earlier works, the book relies heavily on personal accounts, drawing its strong emotional content from their stories. She wrote, "The America of today would not be the same America without the achievements of its ethnic Chinese," and that "scratch the surface of every American celebrity of Chinese heritage and you will find that, no matter how stellar their achievements, no matter how great their contribution to US society, virtually all of them have had their identities questioned at one point or another."

Public notability and legacy 
Success as an author made Iris Chang a public figure. The Rape of Nanking placed her in great demand as a speaker and as an interview subject, and, more broadly, as a spokesperson for the viewpoint that the Japanese government had not done enough to compensate victims of their invasion of China. In one often-mentioned incident (as reported by The Times of London):

...she confronted the Japanese Ambassador to the United States on television, demanded an apology and expressed her dissatisfaction with his mere acknowledgement "that really unfortunate things happened, acts of violence were committed by members of the Japanese military". "It is because of these types of wording and the vagueness of such expressions that Chinese people, I think, are infuriated," was her reaction.

Chang's visibility as a public figure increased with her final work, The Chinese in America. After her death, she became the subject of tributes from fellow writers. Mo Hayder dedicated a novel to her. Reporter Richard Rongstad eulogized her as "Iris Chang lit a flame and passed it to others and we should not allow that flame to be extinguished."

In 2007, the documentary Nanking was dedicated to Chang, as well as the Chinese victims of Nanking.

"The Man Who Ended History", a story in The Paper Managerie by Ken Liu about uncovering the history of Unit 731, is dedicated to the memory of Chang.

R.F. Kuang's debut novel, The Poppy War, is dedicated to Iris Chang.

Iris Chang Park in San Jose, that opened in November 2019, is a municipal park dedicated to Chang.

Depression and death 

Chang suffered a nervous breakdown in August 2004, which her family, friends, and doctors attributed in part to constant sleep deprivation, dozens of herbal supplements, and heavy doses of psychologically damaging prescription medication. At the time, she was several months into research for her fourth book, about the Bataan Death March. She was also promoting The Chinese in America. While en route to Harrodsburg, Kentucky, where she planned to gain access to a "time capsule" of audio recordings from servicemen, she suffered an extreme bout of depression that left her unable to leave her hotel room in Louisville. A local veteran, Arthur Kelly, who was assisting her research helped her check into Norton Psychiatric Hospital in Louisville, where she was diagnosed with reactive psychosis, placed on heavy medication for three days and then released to her parents. After the release from the hospital, she continued to suffer from depression and experienced the side effects of several medications she was taking. Chang was also reportedly deeply disturbed by much of the subject matter of her research.

On November 9, 2004, at about 9 a.m., Chang was found dead in the driver's seat of her Oldsmobile Alero car by a Santa Clara Valley Water District employee on a rural road south of Los Gatos, California and west of State Route 17, in Santa Clara County. Investigators concluded that Chang had shot herself through the mouth with a revolver. At the time of her death, she had been taking the medications Depakote and Risperdal to stabilize her mood.

It was later discovered that she had left behind three suicide notes each dated November 8, 2004. "Statement of Iris Chang" stated:
I promise to get up and get out of the house every morning. I will stop by to visit my parents then go for a long walk. I will follow the doctor's orders for medications. I promise not to hurt myself. I promise not to visit Web sites that talk about suicide.

The next note was a draft of the third:
When you believe you have a future, you think in terms of generations and years. When you do not, you live not just by the day — but by the minute. It is far better that you remember me as I was—in my heyday as a best-selling author—than the wild-eyed wreck who returned from Louisville. ... Each breath is becoming difficult for me to take—the anxiety can be compared to drowning in an open sea. I know that my actions will transfer some of this pain to others, indeed those who love me the most. Please forgive me.

The third note included:
There are aspects of my experience in Louisville that I will never understand. Deep down I suspect that you may have more answers about this than I do. I can never shake my belief that I was being recruited, and later persecuted, by forces more powerful than I could have imagined. Whether it was the CIA or some other organization I will never know. As long as I am alive, these forces will never stop hounding me.

Days before I left for Louisville I had a deep foreboding about my safety. I sensed suddenly threats to my own life: an eerie feeling that I was being followed in the streets, the white van parked outside my house, damaged mail arriving at my P.O. Box. I believe my detention at Norton Hospital was the government's attempt to discredit me.

A report from the San Francisco Chronicle stated that news of her suicide had a strong impact on survivors of the Nanking Massacre and the Chinese community in general.

Memorials
In tribute to Chang, the survivors held a service at the Nanjing Massacre Memorial Hall, around the same time as her funeral, held at the Gate of Heaven Cemetery in Los Altos, California on November 12, 2004. The Memorial Hall, which collects documents, photos, and human remains from the massacre, added both a wing and a bronze statue dedicated to Chang in 2005.

In 2017, the Iris Chang Memorial Hall was built in Huai'an, China.

In 2019, Iris Chang Park was inaugurated in the Rincon district of San Jose.

Publications by Iris Chang

Publications about Iris Chang

See also 
 Global Alliance for Preserving the History of WWII in Asia
 John Rabe
 Nanking (1937－1945)

References

Further reading 
Nightmare in Nanking (1997)

External links 
 IrisChang.net — the official home page of Iris Chang
 Guide to the Iris Chang Papers at the California Ethnic and Multicultural Archives of the University of California at Santa Barbara
 Inventory of the Iris Chang papers at the Hoover Institution Archives of Stanford University. The PDF link leads to the detailed listing called: "Inventory of the Iris Chang papers, 1877-2007" (Collection No. 2004C22: 403 manuscript boxes, 4 cubic foot boxes, 5 oversize boxes, 1 oversize folder, occupying 177.6 linear feet, acquired by the collection posthumously in 2004, with a substantial increment in 2005, and an additional increment in 2011)
 Inventory of the Iris Chang Papers -Alumni Records at the University of Illinois. Clicking the PDF link will lead to the document: "Iris Chang Papers 1937-1938, 1981-1990, 1996-2003" (Collection No. 26/20/122: 17 boxes, 3.4 cubic feet, acquired May 24, 2002). As well there is an additional listing for a second Academic collection for the periods 1937–1938, 1981–1990, 1998 & 2002 (Collection No. 26/20/122, 2.3 cubic feet, 3 boxes)
 Global Alliance for Preserving the History of WWII in Asia — a federation of NGOs whose mission was to educate the world about the unrecognized wartime horrors committed by Japan in the Pacific theater

 "Nightmare in Nanking", an essay by Sue De Pasquale about Chang's book The Rape of Nanking, Humanities and the Arts, Johns Hopkins Magazine
 Iris Chang Memorial Fund - The fund is committed to carrying out Iris Chang's unfinished dreams and preserving her legacy
 

1968 births
2004 deaths
2004 suicides
20th-century American women writers
21st-century American women
American journalists of Chinese descent
American writers of Taiwanese descent
American women journalists of Asian descent
American women writers of Chinese descent
Associated Press people
Burials in California
Female suicides
Johns Hopkins University alumni
Nanjing Massacre
People from Champaign, Illinois
People from Princeton, New Jersey
Writers from San Jose, California
Suicides by firearm in California
University Laboratory High School (Urbana, Illinois) alumni
Writers from Illinois
Writers from New Jersey